

The Caproni Ca.316 was a reconnaissance seaplane produced in Italy during World War II, intended for catapult operations from Italian Navy capital ships. It was a member of the large family of Caproni designs derived from the Ca.306 airliner prototype of 1935, and more directly a modification of the Ca.310 Idro seaplane.

The basic Ca.310 design was modified with the attachment of large pontoons carried underneath the engine nacelles on streamlined pylons, and a revised nose with extensive glazing on the ventral surface.

14 examples were built, but none entered service.

Specifications

References
 
 
 Уголок неба

Ca.316
1940s Italian military reconnaissance aircraft
Floatplanes
Low-wing aircraft
Aircraft first flown in 1940
Twin piston-engined tractor aircraft